Louis F. Farley  was an American politician who served as the Mayor of Marlborough, Massachusetts and who served on the Marlborough, Massachusetts School Committee.

Notes

Mayors of Marlborough, Massachusetts